Beverly Hills Bodysnatchers is a 1989 comedy film directed by Jonathan Mostow.

Plot
A doctor and a mortician team up to do re-animation experiments on corpses using money borrowed from the mafia. When they can't pay it back, the mafia boss sends his nephews to work at the funeral home to keep a watch on the debtors. The nephews end up helping to search for new bodies, and mayhem ensues when some undesirable types are re-animated.

Cast
Vic Tayback as Lou
Frank Gorshin as Doc
Art Metrano as Vic
Rodney Eastman as Freddy
Warren Selko as Vincent
Seth Jaffe as Don Carlo
Brooke Bundy as Mona Darren
Keone Young as Don Ho
Christian Hoff as Stu
Jonathan Mostow as Lab Technician

External links
 

1989 direct-to-video films
American direct-to-video films
1989 directorial debut films
Films directed by Jonathan Mostow
1989 comedy films
1989 films
American comedy films
American zombie films
1980s English-language films
1980s American films